Victor John Yannacone is an environmental attorney who played a role in campaigns to ban DDT in the United States and expose the effects of Agent Orange on Vietnam veterans. He was known for using the motto "sue the bastards."

References

External links
Link to 1993 Interview transcript
 Brief biographical sketch
 Beginnings of EDF campaign with Charles Wurster

Year of birth missing (living people)
Living people
American environmentalists
New York (state) lawyers
People from Patchogue, New York
People from Yaphank, New York